Platyedra is a genus of moth in the family Gelechiidae.

Species
 Platyedra cunctatrix Meyrick, 1931
 Platyedra erebodoxa Meyrick, 1927
 Platyedra piceicoma Meyrick, 1931
 Platyedra subcinerea (Haworth, 1828) (=Anacampsis parviocellatella Bruand, 1850)

References

Pexicopiini